Kálmán Cseh von Szent-Katolna (28 November 1892 – 14 March 1986) was a Hungarian equestrian. He competed in four events at the 1928 Summer Olympics.

Personal life
Cseh served as an officer in the Royal Hungarian Army. During the Second World War, he participated in the Hungarian resistance movement and was deported by Nazi forces. After 1949, Cseh worked as a farmer.

References

1892 births
1986 deaths
Hungarian male equestrians
Olympic equestrians of Hungary
Equestrians at the 1928 Summer Olympics
Sportspeople from Budapest
Hungarian military personnel
Hungarian resistance members
Hungarian farmers